The second season of Happy Endings, an American television series. ABC officially renewed Happy Endings for a second season on May 13, 2011. It was later announced it would move to a new time-slot on Wednesdays at 9:30pm, as a lead-in to new series Revenge. It premiered on September 28, 2011.

On November 3, 2011, ABC picked up the show for a full 22-episode second season. However the 21st episode to air was labeled as the season finale by ABC as they "needed" to premiere Don't Trust the B---- in Apartment 23 on April 11, 2012. Despite the episode officially being held back for the third season, the 22nd episode aired on E4 in the UK on May 17, 2012, and other international markets, as part of the second season.

Although the season was not officially released on DVD until October 23, 2012, the DVD was included in a release that contains the first two seasons of the show that was released on August 14, 2012.

Summary
From cranky landlords, nosy childhood friends, Brozilians, gym bullies, sexy Halloween costumes, to racist parrots. Season two offers more of the six best friends navigating life and love in Chicago's hip downtown. Dave and Alex have managed to stay friends, and continue to reshuffle their feelings. Jane tests out her maternal instincts while hubby Brad unwittingly gets a "work wife." Max actually lands the perfect boyfriend that the gang falls in love with. Meanwhile, "The Year of Penny" is off to a rocky start as Penny struggles with everything from birthday curses to 1980s-themed scavenger hunts.

Cast

Starring
 Eliza Coupe as Jane Kerkovich-Williams
 Elisha Cuthbert as Alex Kerkovich
 Zachary Knighton as Dave Rose
 Adam Pally as Max Blum
 Damon Wayans, Jr. as Brad Williams
 Casey Wilson as Penny Hartz

Recurring
 Seth Morris as Scotty (3 episodes)
 James Wolk as Grant (3 episodes)
 Megan Mullally as Dana Hartz (2 episodes)
Brandon Johnson as Daryl (2 episodes)
 Stephen Guarino as Derrick (2 episodes)
 Larry Wilmore as Mr. Forristal (2 episodes)
 Mary Elizabeth Ellis as Daphne Wilson (1 episode)
 Brian Austin Green as Chris (1 episode)
 Tom Kenny as Tyler Kerkovich (1 episode)
 Michael McKean as 'Big' Dave Rose (1 episode)
 Paul Scheer as Avi (1 episode)
 Mikaela Hoover as Jackie (1 episode)

Notable guest stars
 Derek Waters as Glaze ("Blax, Snake, Home")
 Megan Park as Chloe ("Baby Steps")
 Nicole Gale Anderson as Madison ("Baby Steps")
 Alex Kapp Horner as Kelly ("Baby Steps")
 Noureen DeWulf as Molly ("Secrets and Limos")
 Matt Besser as Rick ("Spooky Endings")
 David Walton as Henry ("Spooky Endings")
 Brent Musburger as himself ("Lying Around")
 Fred Savage as himself ("Lying Around")
 Riki Lindhome as Angie ("The Code War")
 Angelique Cabral as Vanessa ("The Code War")
 Hayes MacArthur as Steven ("The Code War")
 Rob Riggle as Drew ("Full Court Dress")
 Chryssie Whitehead as Janet ("Full Court Dress")
 Gary Anthony Williams as Officer Jones ("Grinches Be Crazy")
 Jamie Denbo as Gita ("Grinches Be Crazy")
 Ken Marino as Richard Rickman ("The Shrink, the Dare, Her Date and Her Brother")
 Sarah Wright as Nikki ("The Shrink, the Dare, Her Date and Her Brother")
 Ed Begley, Jr. as himself ("Meat the Parrots")
 Ryan Hansen as Jeff Niebert ("Makin' Changes!")
 Lindsey Kraft as Lindsay ("The St. Valentine's Day Maxssacre")
 Colin Hanks as himself ("Cocktails & Dreams")
 Richard Edson as himself ("The Kerkovich Way")
 Bobby Moynihan as Corey ("You Snooze, You Bruise")
 Ben Falcone as Darren ("Big White Lies")

Episodes

Production 
ABC officially renewed Happy Endings for a second season on May 13, 2011. On , with the reveal of ABC 2011-12 schedule, it was announced the series would be moving to an earlier time-slot of  Eastern/ Central on Wednesdays as a lead-in to new series, Revenge.

Reception

Critical reception
The second season currently holds an average of 67 out of 100 from critics on Metacritic, which indicates generally favorable reviews.

Tom Gliatto from People said the series "has clicked as one of prime-time's most sophisticated ensemble comedies". While TV Guide's Matt Roush said the show was "an under-inspired Friends-wannabe", he praised the performances of Casey Wilson and Adam Pally. On The A.V. Club, the season contains the highest graded episode of the series to-date, "The Butterfly Effect Effect", with a grade of an A on a scale of A to F.

U.S. Ratings

Home media

References 

2011 American television seasons
2012 American television seasons